Berna Carrasco Araya (Carrasco de Budinich) (19 December 1914 – 7 July 2013) was a Chilean chess master, born in San Bernardo, Chile.  At the 1939 Women's World Championship in Buenos Aires, she finished in third place behind Vera Menchik and Sonja Graf.
Carrasco was awarded the Woman International Master (WIM) title in 1954.

References

External links
 
 
 

1914 births
2013 deaths
Chilean female chess players
Chess Woman International Masters
People from Maipo Province